John Tebbutt (25 May 1834 – 29 November 1916) was an Australian astronomer, famous for discovering the "Great Comet of 1861".

Early life
Tebbutt was born at Windsor, New South Wales, the only son of John Tebbutt, then a prosperous store keeper. His grandfather, John Tebbutt, was one of the early settlers in Australia; he arrived at Sydney about the end of 1801.
Tebbutt was educated first at the Church of England parish school, then at a private school kept by the Rev. Mathew Adam of the local Presbyterian church, and finally at a small but excellent school under the Rev. Henry Tarlton Stiles, where he had a sound training in Latin.

Career
In 1845 Tebbutt's father purchased a tract of land at the eastern end of the town of Windsor known as the peninsula, and built a residence there. In 1853 John Tebutt purchased a sextant and using this along with an ordinary marine telescope and a watch began his observations of the heavens.

About nine years later, on 13 May 1861, Tebbutt discovered the 1861 comet, one of the most brilliant comets known. There was no means then of telegraphing the intelligence to England where it became visible on 29 June. Tebbutt was acknowledged as the first discoverer of this comet, and the first to compute its approximate orbit. In November 1861 he purchased an excellent refracting telescope of  aperture and  focal length. In 1862, on the resignation of the Rev. W. Scott, he was offered the position of government astronomer for New South Wales but refused it.

Tebbutt also discovered Nova Scorpii 1862, a nova visible to the unaided eye.

Observatory

In 1863 he built, with his own hands, a small observatory close to his father's residence, and installed his instruments consisting of his 3¼-inch telescope, a two-inch transit instrument, and an eight-day half-seconds box-chronometer. Shortly before this period Tebbutt had begun to record meteorological observations, and in 1868 published these for the years 1863 to 1866 under the title Meteorological Observations made at the Private Observatory of John Tebbutt, Jnr.

He continued the publication of these records at intervals for more than 30 years. He had also begun a long series of papers which were published in the Monthly Notices of the Royal Astronomical Society of London, in the Astronomical Register, London, and in the Journal and Proceedings of the Royal Society of New South Wales. He contributed to other scientific journals, and made an immense number of contributions to the Australian press.

In 1872 a  equatorial refracting scope was purchased for the observatory, in 1881 Tebbutt discovered another great comet, now designated C/1881 K1, and in 1886 a new telescope of  aperture and  focal length was purchased, which enabled him to considerably extend his operations. He published in 1887 History and description of Mr. Tebbutt's observatory, Windsor, New South Wales, and followed this with a yearly Report for about 15 years.

Between 1868 and 1902 he made 396 lunar occultation observations.

A branch of the British Astronomical Association was established at Sydney in 1895 and Tebbutt was elected its first president. In 1904 in his seventieth year he discontinued systematic work, though he retained his interest in astronomy and continued to do some observing, and in the following year the Royal Astronomical Society of London recognised his work by awarding him the Jackson-Gwilt Medal of the society.

In 1908, Tebbutt published his Astronomical Memoirs, giving an account of his 54 years' work, and he was much gratified in 1914, during the visit of the British association, by a visit to his observatory of a small party of astronomers. He died at Windsor on 29 November 1916.

The year after his death his son delivered John Tebbutt's working library and manuscripts to the State Library of New South Wales. The John Tebbutt Memorial Collection is made up of 3,676 printed volumes, 117 volumes of manuscripts and 235 pamphlets.

He was commemorated on the reverse side of the Australian one hundred-dollar note (in circulation 1984 until 1996 when it was replaced by a portrait of Sir John Monash).

References

External links 

 
 History and Description of Mr Tebbutt's Observatory
 Astronomical Memoirs
 John Tebbutt Memorial Collection
Article includes material from Project Gutenberg of Australia, which is in the public domain.

1834 births
1916 deaths
19th-century Australian astronomers
Discoverers of comets
People from New South Wales